These are the Billboard magazine number-one albums of 1995, per the Billboard 200.

Chart history

See also
1995 in music
List of number-one albums (United States)

References

1995
1995 record charts